Rodney Hardeway (born February 13, 1986) is a former professional Canadian football defensive end. He was signed as an undrafted free agent by the St. Louis Rams in 2008. He played college football for the UL-Lafayette Ragin' Cajuns.

Hardeway was also a member of the Montreal Alouettes.

External links
Montreal Alouettes bio

1986 births
Living people
Sportspeople from Tyler, Texas
American players of Canadian football
American football defensive ends
Canadian football defensive linemen
Louisiana Ragin' Cajuns football players
St. Louis Rams players
Montreal Alouettes players
Alabama Vipers players
Georgia Force players